Larry Spokes (30 August 1920 – 12 September 2007) was  a former Australian rules footballer who played with South Melbourne in the Victorian Football League (VFL).

References

External links 		
		

1920 births		
2007 deaths		
Australian rules footballers from Victoria (Australia)		
Sydney Swans players
Colac Football Club players